Garrochales may refer to:

Places
Garrochales, Arecibo, Puerto Rico, a barrio
Garrochales, Barceloneta, Puerto Rico, a barrio